Cheng Li Hui  (born 1976) is a Singaporean politician and businesswoman. A member of the governing People's Action Party (PAP), she has been the Member of Parliament (MP) representing the Tampines East division of Tampines GRC since 2015.

Education
Cheng graduated from the National University of Singapore with a Bachelor of Arts degree. She subsequently went on to complete a Master of Applied Finance degree at Macquarie University.

Career

Political career
Prior to entering politics, Cheng had 12 years of grassroots experience, helping out with the governing People's Action Party with its Meet-the-People Sessions at the Bukit Panjang Branch. 

Cheng made her political debut in the 2015 general election as part of a five-member PAP team contesting in Tampines GRC and won. She was subsequently elected as the Member of Parliament (MP) representing the Tampines West division of Tampines GRC. She was also appointed Deputy District Advisor in the PAP Women's Wing in 2016.

Business career
Cheng has been serving as Deputy Chief Executive Officer of Hai Leck Holdings since 2012.

She is also a board member in Allied Construction, Hai Leck Engineering, Enzo Investment, Hai Leck Development, Hai Leck Holdings and Cheng Capital Holdings.

Personal life
She is the daughter of Cheng Buck Poh, the founder and Executive Chairman of Hai Leck Holdings. She has three siblings; Don Cheng Yao Tong, Cheng Li Chen and Cheng Wee Ling.

References

External links
 Cheng Li Hui on Parliament of Singapore

Living people
People's Action Party politicians
Singaporean people of Teochew descent
Place of birth missing (living people)
1985 births
Singaporean women in politics
Members of the Parliament of Singapore